Chapman Tripp is New Zealand's largest commercial law firm. It is considered one of the "big three" law firms along with Russell McVeagh and Bell Gully. Established in New Zealand in 1875, it now has around 60 partners and roughly 200 legal staff across its offices in Auckland, Wellington and Christchurch. The firm practises in all areas of corporate and commercial, property, construction, finance, tax, dispute resolution, environmental and public law.

History
Chapman Tripp started as a one-man practice in Wellington in 1875 with Martin Chapman. Chapman was joined in partnership by William Fitzgerald in 1882 and then by Leonard Owen Howard Tripp  in 1889, who spent a record 69 years with the firm.

The firm went through many name changes, reverting to Chapman Tripp & Co in 1949.

In 1962 the firm opened an Auckland office, becoming the first law firm to have offices in both Auckland and Wellington. In 1985 Chapman Tripp merged with Sheffield Young and Ellis, becoming Chapman Tripp Sheffield Young, and in late 1997 the Christchurch office was opened.

Notable alumni
Supreme Court judge Justice Arnold was a partner of predecessor firm Chapman Tripp Sheffield Young between 1985 and 1994. He later served as Solicitor-General between 2000 and 2006 before becoming a judge of the Court of Appeal, sitting from 2006 until his elevation to the Supreme Court.

The Honourable Justice Sir Mark O'Regan of the Court of Appeal served as partner at Chapman Tripp from 1984. He was appointed to the High Court in 2001, and was elevated to the Court of Appeal in 2004 where he served as President of the Court of Appeal, until his elevation to the Supreme Court in September 2014. Justice Miller was a partner at Chapman Tripp from 1987, until appointment to the High Court in 2004, and then to the Court of Appeal in June 2013.

High Court judges Collins, Ellis, Gilbert, Jagose, Katz, MacKenzie and Peters of the High Court all previously held roles at Chapman Tripp, as have a number of District Court judges.

Supporting the Arts 
Chapman Tripp is a major supporter of the arts and communities in New Zealand. Chapman Tripp sponsored the Chapman Tripp Theatre Awards from 1992 - 2014. The annual awards were established to honour the best in theatre in Wellington. The awards have been a major highlight of the year in the capital's art and social calendar.

In addition, Chapman Tripp supports the Auckland Philharmonia Orchestra, Orchestra Wellington, the Christchurch Symphony Orchestra, the New Zealand Opera, and Circa Theatre.

Rankings 
Chapman Tripp is regularly ranked as one of New Zealand's leading law firms, and is considered a top-tier firm in Banking, Finance and Project Finance; Capital Markets; Corporate Commercial and M&A; Dispute Resolution; Real Estate & Construction; and Restructuring and Insolvency.

Across all three major rankings publications, Chapman Tripp has more top-tier rankings than any other New Zealand firm.

References

External links
 Link to Chapman Tripp website
 Martin Chapman, from Cyclopaedia of New Zealand 1897 
 A younger Martin Chapman, from Early Wellington 1929
 Chapman and Tripp, from Cyclopaedia of New Zealand 1897

Law firms of New Zealand
Law firms established in 1875
New Zealand companies established in 1875